The Estádio Municipal Parque do Sabiá, also known as Parque do Sabiá ("Thrush Park"), is a multi-use stadium in Uberlândia, Brazil. It is currently used mostly for football matches. It is the home ground of Uberlândia Esporte Clube and Clube Atlético Portal, and is the biggest stadium in Minas Gerais state countryside. The stadium was built in 1982 and is able to hold 53,350 people. It is owned by the Uberlândia City Hall.

History

The stadium was inaugurated on May 27, 1982, as Parque do Sabiá (meaning Thrush's Park).

In 1995, the stadium was renamed to Estádio Municipal João Havelange (João Havelange Municipal Stadium), after a suggestion of the city councilor Leonídio Bouças. However, the name change was not very popular among the city's football fans, and the stadium is still commonly called the Parque do Sabiá.

The inaugural match was played on May 27, 1982, when the Brazil national football team beat the Republic of Ireland national football team 7–0. The first goal of the stadium was scored by Brazil's Falcão.

The stadium's attendance record currently stands at 80,000, set on the inaugural match.

In 2015, the stadium was renamed to Estádio Municipal Parque do Sabiá, due to FIFA scandals.

References

Enciclopédia do Futebol Brasileiro, Volume 2 - Lance, Rio de Janeiro: Aretê Editorial S/A, 2001.

External links
Templos do Futebol

Sports venues in Minas Gerais
Football venues in Minas Gerais
Copa América stadiums